Branimir Popov (born 10 May 1962) is a Bulgarian swimmer. He competed in two events at the 1980 Summer Olympics.

References

1962 births
Living people
Bulgarian male swimmers
Olympic swimmers of Bulgaria
Swimmers at the 1980 Summer Olympics
Sportspeople from Sofia
20th-century Bulgarian people
21st-century Bulgarian people